Maraea Morete (24 July 1844–8 October 1907) was a New Zealand tribal leader and writer. She is the daughter of William and Puihi Morris. Of Māori descent, she identified with the Ngati Porou and Te Aitanga-a-Mahaki iwi. She was born in Hawke's Bay, New Zealand, either at Whakaari, near Tongoio, or at Waikokopu, near Mahia, on 24 July 1844. She died on 8 October 1907 after suffering severe injuries caused by burns from a fire.

References

1844 births
1907 deaths
19th-century women rulers
New Zealand Māori writers
Ngāti Porou people
Te Aitanga-a-Māhaki people